Isabel Island is an island in the Strait of Magellan. It is located near the western shores of the Strait about 3.5 km east of the narrowest part of Brunswick Peninsula. The island is famous for being the place where large-scale sheepherding was first practiced in Southern Patagonia.

It is served by Marco Davison Bascur Airport.

See also
Los Pingüinos Natural Monument
Magdalena Island

References

Islands of Magallanes Region
Strait of Magellan